The following games were initially announced as Nintendo Switch titles, however were subsequently cancelled or postponed indefinitely by developers or publishers.

Games

References

 
Nintendo Switch games
Nintendo Switch